Prince Bounkhong was the last uparaja of Luang Phrabang. He was granted the title of Chao Ratsaphakhinay by King Chulalongkorn of Siam in 1884. From 1911 to 1920, he was a member of the Government Council of French Indochina.

Chao Maha Oupahat Bounkhong was the father of Phetsarath, Souvanna Phouma, Souphanouvong and Souvannarath.  He died at Luang Phrabang on 26 July 1920, having had 11 sons and 13 daughters by 11 wives.

References

Bibliography
 

Laotian princes
Laotian royalty
1920 deaths
1857 births